Mursyakovo (Mörsäk) is a rural locality (a village) in Yefremkinsky Selsoviet, Karmaskalinsky District, Bashkortostan, Russia. The population was 77 as of 2010. There are 2 streets.

Geography 
Mursyakovo is located 22 km south of Karmaskaly (the district's administrative centre) by road. Antonovka is the nearest rural locality.

References 

Rural localities in Karmaskalinsky District